Panasonic Lumix DMC-FZ20 is a 2004 superzoom bridge digital camera by Panasonic. It is the successor of the FZ10. The highest-resolution pictures it records are 2,560 by 1,920 pixels (5 megapixels). It has a polycrystalline, thin-film transistor, liquid crystal display and EVF (electronic view finder). It records to Secure Digital media. The camera also has a microphone. The camera's dimensions are 127.6 mm (5.02 inches) in width, 87.2 mm (3.43 inches) in height, and 106.2 mm (4.18 inches) in depth. Its mass is 520 g (18.3 ounces).

This camera is known for its Leica lens with "Mega OIS" optical image stabilisation. It has a 12x optical zoom, often said to be equal to a 400 mm lens, which can stay f/2.8 for the entire zoom range. There are full manual controls too. Optional lenses are available to double the focal length or for wide-angle view.

Modes include full automatic, aperture priority, shutter priority, full manual, macro (from 5 centimetres on), film, and sequence of shots. Film is recorded at 320x240 px resolution in mJPEG format and playable in QuickTime.

Files can be stored in TIFF and two levels of JPEG, either a high quality or lower quality. The camera can be set to save both a JPEG and TIFF file.

The lens itself extends from the barrel of the camera and cannot have filters or lens hoods attached directly to it. A special adapter is required which allows 72 mm filters and the included lens hood to be attached to the barrel of the camera.  Alternatively, adapters are available from third-party manufacturers that allow less expensive 62 mm filters to be used.

Its successors are the FZ30, announced on July 20, 2005, and the FZ50, announced around a year later.

References

External links 

Review at Digital Photography Review.
Review at Digital Camera Resource Page.

Bridge digital cameras
Superzoom cameras
FZ20
Live-preview digital cameras